Deadly Medicines and Organised Crime: How Big Pharma Has Corrupted Healthcare is a book by Peter C. Gøtzsche with forewords by Richard Smith and Drummond Rennie. It was published by Taylor & Francis in 2013.

The book documents activities by major pharmaceutical companies that include corruption, fraud, bribery, and omission of data to market their products. While all drugs have side effects not all have benefits. The influx of money by pharma undercuts regulation, education, and scientific integrity. Gøtzsche makes proposals on how to improve the situation.

Précis 

The book has two forewords, contains 22 chapters with over 1,100 references (up to the year 2013) and is followed by an index.

In the Introduction, Gøtzsche points out that drugs are the third leading cause of death after heart disease and cancer in the US and Europe. He estimates that about 200,000 persons die annually just in the US either from side effects or errors (p. 259). Like the Tobacco industry pharmaceutical companies have been good at selling lies about their products. Almost all we know about drugs is what companies have chosen to tell us. Gøtzsche asserts that his book is not about those drugs which provide benefits and are useful nor is it about people who in good faith work in the pharma industry but about a system failure that allows the industry to act like organized crime.

In the main section, Gøtzsche starts off with relating his experience when working in the pharmaceutical industry before becoming a physician. He then compares the similarities between big pharma and organized crime pointing out that actions by the industry fulfill criteria as set by the United States Organized Crime Control Act of 1970, the centerpiece of which is the Racketeer Influenced and Corrupt Organizations Act (RICO). Gøtzsche argues that big pharma is actively racketeering. His “Hall of Shame” is populated by major pharmaceutical companies that have agreed to pay settlement fines when accused of criminal activities. Yet fines are small in relation to profits generated from fraud.
 
Gøtzsche indicates that many patients do not benefit from the drugs they take. There is too much deception. Trials that are improperly set up and data analysis can be fraudulent. Unwelcome results are suppressed or hidden. Pharmaceutical companies have an inherent interest to show that their product is superior. The “best” drug may be the one with the “most shamelessly biased data.”(p. 55) Gøtzsche argues that for-profit research companies that rely on pharmaceutical money are running now most clinical trials and rather than true research, many of these studies are done for marketing.

Medical journals have conflicts of interest being dependent on revenue from the industry. Doctors succumb to financial incentives pharma provides. Gøtzsche noted that in Denmark, in 2010  about 12% of physicians worked in one way or another for the drug companies. They may become a “clinical investigator” to report on “me-too” drugs or participate in “seeding trials”. Gøtzsche describes these activities as forms of marketing.

A lot of money is spent to develop so-called me-too drugs that provide little if any therapeutic advance or may be even more harmful. Money buys “experts” and “opinion leaders” to convince doctors to use the more “modern” newer drugs. Companies increase profits by switching from similar cheaper drugs to expensive ones, i.e. human insulin to  GM-insulin, or marketing isomers of established drugs (i.e. Prilosec-Nexium). Advertising is allowed in some countries and helps with the marketing. So-called patient advocacy groups are often just handmaids for marketing.

Drug regulation has been weakened over the years. Examples are the 1992 Prescription Drug User Fee Act in the US that sped up reviews at the cost of quality, and the 2008 decision that trials outside of the US do not have to adhere to the Declaration of Helsinki but can be submitted for drug approval. Politicians are allowed to interfere in the decisions of the FDA.  Agencies are flooded with binders of documents for drugs that add nothing new. Conflicts of interest hamper the work of the regulatory agencies starting with the “revolving door” phenomenon and “regulatory capture” (regulators becoming cozy with industry).  He noted that the lack of reliability of regulatory reviews has led to label changes in 51% of drugs due to a major safety issue after marketing. Gøtzsche discusses how certain drugs have been pushed through the regulatory process only to be withdrawn at a later time after having harmed and killed thousands of patients. The list here includes Vioxx, Bextra, Aminorex, Pondimin, Redux, Avandia, and Rezulin.

Gøtzsche devotes two chapters on the problems of drugs in psychiatry, the myth of a "chemical imbalance" in the brain that they are supposed to correct, and the harms that psychotropic drugs do. Psychiatry has moved from its unscientific analytical approach to unscientific drug pushing. Gøtzsche believes that, overall, psychotropic drugs do more harm than good and demonstrates that unless a trial is not set in an "impeccable" way results cannot be trusted.

In the final chapters, Gøtzsche takes issues with “myths” that are commonly stated about the pharmaceutical industry, i.e. the high cost of medications is related to research and development. Much of this money goes to unnecessary me-too drug development, lobbying, marketing, and profits. He proposes new approaches to fix the system, such as transparency of data, clinical trials prior to approval to be done by independent agents, and the use of relevant patient populations, comparators, and outcomes. He is also critical of marketing as "...the products should speak for themselves"(p. 275).

Reviews
Gøtzsche is an outspoken and knowledgeable critic who wrote the book to “influence policy
towards much more transparency”. He also indicates that he published a book as it was difficult to publish his criticism in medical journals. Andrew Haynes finds his criticism caustic. Justin B. Biddle  indicates that while most of the material has been covered before, Gøtzsche adds a wealth of detail. Tom Yates who agrees with the author on many fundamental points finds the book could have been better. He indicates that there is too much hyperbole "and, in places, (it is) a little offensive". James Dickinson noted that the book is comprehensive and the "barrage of evidence is overwhelming".  Better editing with a more careful attention to writing and referencing would have improved the book.

Awards 
Recipient of  2014 BMA Medical Book Awards, Basis of Medicine

References 

2013 non-fiction books
Books about health care